Barry Stuppler (born December 23, 1944) is an American coin dealer and former President of the American Numismatic Association (ANA).  In 2003, he served on the California State Quarter Commission that created the California State Quarter.

Career
Stuppler has been a coin dealer for over 50 years; he is the founder of Barry Stuppler and Co. Inc. and its subsidiary, Mint State Gold.  He has appeared on or in news programs and publications such as Fox Business Network and CNBC.

In 1989, Stuppler made a bid to purchase the Berlin Wall.   He bid $50 million and stated that he had planned to sell the pieces.  At the time, he was also the President of the Gold and Silver Financial Group.

Stuppler was a member of Governor Gray Davis' 20-person California State Quarter Commission in 2003.  The commission created 5 concepts from which Arnold Schwarzenegger chose the final design.

He co-founded and serves on the board of the Industry Council for Tangible Assets.  He also served on the board of the Professional Numismatists Guild, and in July 2017 was elected to a two-year term as President of the PNG 10.  He is also President of the California Coin and Bullion Merchants Association.

Gold & Silver Political Action Committee
Stuppler serves as Chairman of the Gold & Silver Political Action Committee, a PAC founded in 2010 and designed to help elect public officials with a better understanding of the numismatic and precious metals community and pending legislation and regulatory issues that could positively impact or adversely affect the hobby and profession, according to Stuppler.

American Numismatic Association
Stuppler joined the American Numismatic Association in 1968.  He served on its board from 2001 to 2005 and served as vice-president from 2005 to 2007.  In 2007, he became president of the ANA and served in that position until 2009.

Awards
In 2004, he received the Century Club Award from the American Numismatic Association (ANA) for recruiting new members and the Abe Kosoff Founder's Award.   He received the Exemplary Service Award in 2011 for going "above and beyond" the call of his duties for the ANA.

References

Living people
American numismatists
American lobbyists
1944 births